Slavoj may refer to:

Karel Slavoj Amerling (1807–1884), Czech teacher, writer, and philosopher
Slavoj Černý (born 1937), Czech former cyclist
Slavoj Žižek (born 1949), Slovenian philosopher

See also
Záboj and Slavoj, outdoor sculpture by Josef Václav Myslbek, installed at Vyšehradské sady in Vyšehrad, Prague, Czech Republic
Slavoljub

Czech masculine given names
nl:Slavoj